Vitaly N. Efimov (Russian: Вита́лий Никола́евич Ефи́мов) is a Russian theoretical physicist. He proposed the existence of a novel and exotic state of matter now dubbed the Efimov State as a researcher in A. F. Ioffe Physico-Technical Institute, USSR Academy of Sciences, Leningrad, USSR in his 1970 paper "Energy levels arising from resonant two-body forces in a three-body system". It was announced in 2006 that the existence of this state of matter had been confirmed.

He is now an affiliate professor of physics at the University of Washington.

In 2018 he has been selected as the winner of the Inaugural Fadeev Medal.

References

External links 
March 15, 2006: Atoms in new state of matter behave like Three Musketeers: All for one, one for all
May 27, 2014: Physicists Prove Surprising Rule of Threes

1938 births
Living people
Russian physicists
Theoretical physicists
Fellows of the American Physical Society